Fraser Valley West was a federal electoral district in British Columbia, Canada, that was represented in the House of Commons of Canada from 1968 to 1997.

This riding was created in 1966 from parts of Burnaby—Coquitlam, Fraser Valley and New Westminster ridings.

It was abolished in 1996 when it was merged into Langley—Matsqui riding.

It consisted initially of the western part of Matsqui District Municipality and including Crescent Island in the Central Fraser Valley Regional District and part of Surrey District Municipality.

In 1987, it was redefined to consist of:
 the City of Langley;
 the northeastern part of Langley District Municipality, lying north and east of the City of Langley, the Fraser Highway and 240th Street; and
 the northwestern part of Matsqui District Municipality, lying north and west of Matsqui Power Railway right-of-way, and the south boundary of Matsqui District Municipality.

Members of Parliament

This riding elected the following Members of Parliament:

Election results

See also 

 List of Canadian federal electoral districts
 Past Canadian electoral districts

External links
Riding history from the Library of Parliament

Former federal electoral districts of British Columbia